Events in the year 1874 in Brazil.

Incumbents
Monarch – Pedro II
Prime Minister – Viscount of Rio Branco

Events
May 24 - Revolt of the Muckers: religious service was held in Ferrabraz, where Jacobina announced the end of the world and ordered the extermination of 16 enemy families
June 15 - Revolt of the Muckers: massacre of the Kassel family
June 25 - Revolt of the Muckers: 14 houses of the Muckers' enemies were burned and 10 people were killed, including children
June 28 - Revolt of the Muckers: police attack Muckers but are defeated
August 2 - Jacobina Mentz and most of her followers killed by police, who were helped by informant Carlos Luppa. End of the Revolt of the Muckers.
November - Quebra–Quilos revolt

Births
July 30 - João de Deus Mena Barreto (1874–1933), a member of the junta that temporarily governed Brazil when Washington Luís was deposed
November 13 - Vital Soares, lawyer and politician

Deaths
August 2 - Jacobina Mentz Maurer

References

 
1870s in Brazil
Years of the 19th century in Brazil
Brazil
Brazil